Eupithecia luctuosa is a moth in the family Geometridae. It is found in south-eastern China (Fujian).

The wingspan is about 17 mm. The fore- and hindwings are mid brown.

References

Moths described in 2004
luctuosa
Moths of Asia